Zelimkhan Mutsoev (born on October 13, 1959 in Tbilisi) is a Russian political figure and a deputy of the 3rd, 4th, 5th, 6th, 7th, and 8th State Dumas.

In the early 1990s, Mutsoev moved to Moscow. In 1991–1993, he was the director of the Moscow branch of the Association for Foreign Economic Relations of Small and Medium Enterprises, which was engaged in supplying of goods in the USSR. In 1998, Mutsoev engaged in business and became a co-owner of the Pervouralsk New Pipe Plant. In December 1999, he was elected deputy of the 3rd State Duma. In 2003, 2007, 2011, 2016, and 2021 he was re-elected for the 4th, 5th, 6th, 7th, and 8th State Dumas, respectively.

In 2008, the owners of the hotel "Rus" in Kyiv accused Mutsoev of illegally taking their property. Even though he rejected all the accusations, later the documents were revealed that proved the involvement of the Mutsoev family in the raider seizure of the Ukrainian hotel.

In 2016, he took 86th place in the Forbes ranking of 200 wealthiest businessmen in Russia.

Awards  
 Order of Friendship
 Order "For Merit to the Fatherland"
 Order of Honour (Russia)
 Order of Courage

References

1959 births
Living people
United Russia politicians
21st-century Russian politicians
Eighth convocation members of the State Duma (Russian Federation)
Seventh convocation members of the State Duma (Russian Federation)
Sixth convocation members of the State Duma (Russian Federation)
Fifth convocation members of the State Duma (Russian Federation)
Fourth convocation members of the State Duma (Russian Federation)
Third convocation members of the State Duma (Russian Federation)
Kurds in Russia